Prostate saturation biopsy typically entails 40–80 core samples taken from the prostate under general anesthesia.
This technique is used on certain high-risk patients, typically with elevated prostate specific antigen levels, abnormal findings on previous biopsies, or abnormal rectal examinations.

See also
 Prostate biopsy

References 

Biopsy
Prostatic procedures